Marjorie Elizabeth Carveth (later Dunn, April 13, 1925 – January 27, 2019) was a Canadian pitcher who played in the All-American Girls Professional Baseball League during the 1945 season. She batted and threw right handed.

Born in Edmonton, Alberta, Betty Carveth was one of the 68 players born in Canada to join the All-American Girls Professional Baseball League in its twelve years history.

In her only season Carveth posted a combined 4–11 record and a 2.28 earned run average in 21 games for the Rockford Peaches (1945) and the Fort Wayne Daisies. During the best-of-five playoff series, she lost an 11-inning pitching duel with Racine Belles' Doris Barr.

In 1998, she garnered honorary induction in the Canadian Baseball Hall of Fame. She also is part of Women in Baseball, a permanent display based at the Baseball Hall of Fame and Museum in Cooperstown, New York, which was unveiled in 1988 to honor the entire All-American Girls Professional Baseball League.

Betty Carveth Dunn spent the latter part of her life in Edmonton and continued to be involved by awarding an annual $2000 scholarship which is named in her honour and shared with Millie Warwick McAuley, another Canadian who played in the AAGPBL. The scholarship is awarded in Alberta to a young female baseball player who combines excellence on the diamond, in the classroom and in the community. Betty and Millie also were Special Ambassadors during the first-ever World Cup of Women's Baseball held at Edmonton in 2004. In 2017, at the age of 91, Dunn was the oldest person at the time to be inducted into the Alberta Sports Hall of Fame. She died in Edmonton in 2019 at the age of 93.

Career statistics
Pitching

Batting 

Fielding

Sources

1925 births
2019 deaths
All-American Girls Professional Baseball League players
Fort Wayne Daisies players
Rockford Peaches players
Baseball people from Alberta
Canadian baseball players
Sportspeople from Edmonton
21st-century American women